The Bill's Creek Shale is a geologic formation in Michigan. It preserves fossils dating back to the Ordovician period.

References
 

Ordovician System of North America
Ordovician Michigan
Middle Ordovician Series
Upper Ordovician Series